Toofan is a 1989 Indian Hindi-language superhero film directed by Ketan Desai, starring Amitabh Bachchan in a double role as twin brother. One is the title character Toofan, a superhero who uses his crossbow as a weapon, and the other is a magician named Shyam. Salim Khan wrote the story. Ketan Desai's father Manmohan Desai produced the film. The score and soundtrack were composed by Anu Malik.

The movie was an "Average" at the box office.

Plot 
The story revolves around two brothers, one of which has superpowers and is an avid follower of Lord Hanuman. The other character was that of a meek magician who aspires to perform an escape trick which had claimed the life of his street magician father.

Cast 

 Amitabh Bachchan as Toofan and Shyam Jadugar (double role)
 Meenakshi Seshadri as Radha
 Amrita Singh as Pickpocketer
 Farooq Shaikh as Gopal Sharma
 Kamal Kapoor as ACP Sharma
 Goga Kapoor as Daku Shaitan Singh
 Zarina Wahab as Mrs. Laxmi Gopal Sharma
 Sushma Seth as Devyani
 Raza Murad as Vikramjit
 Mahesh Anand as Daku Zaalim Singh
 Jack Gaud as Jagga, an associate of Daku Shaitan singh
 Pran as Inspector Hanuman Prasad Singh "Toofan / Shyam's Father" 
 Manik Irani as Manglu Tribal leader and brother of Radha
 Sudhir Dalvi as Dr Sharma and Gopal's Father
 Ramesh Deo as Ramesh Kumar
Chandrashekhar as Doctor
 Bharat Bhushan as Priest in the temple (shown in the beginning) 
 Jagdish Raj as IGP
Bob Christo as good mark Gold smuggler
Moolchand as Seth Dharamdas
Sonu Walia as Sonu Walia guest appearance in song "Don't Worry be Happy"
Chandrashekhar Dubey as Bride's Father guest appearance in song "Don't Worry be Happy"

Soundtrack 
The music for this movie was given by Anu Malik with lyrics penned by Indeevar. 

The song "Aaya Toofan" was the last song sung by Kishore Kumar for an Amitabh Bachchan film before his death. It is also the only film that Suresh Wadkar sung for Amitabh Bachchan. Although Kishore Kumar was one of the playback singers in the film, his name did not appear on the credit title which comes at the end of the film, but other singers were all credited. 

The song "Haa Bhai Haa" was sampled from the Iranian song "Havar Havar" by Kourosh Yaghmaei which has also inspired the Hindi songs "Jawan Jawan Ishq Jawan Hai" and "Aaya Aaya" from Govinda's Billoo Badshah and Sunny Deol's Aag Ka Gola respectively. The song "Don't Worry Be Happy" drew inspiration from Bobby McFerrin's song "Don't Worry Be Happy".

References

External links 

Films scored by Anu Malik
1989 films
1980s science fiction action films
1980s Indian superhero films
Film superheroes
1980s Hindi-language films
Twins in Indian films
1989 action films
Hindi-language action films
Indian superhero films
Indian science fiction action films
Hindi-language science fiction films